Prúdy is a Slovak rock band formed in the former Czechoslovakia in 1962.

The original lineup of the band consisted of Marián Varga on organ and piano, Pavol Hammel on guitar and vocals, Vlado Mallý on drums, Peter Saller on guitar and Fedor Frešo on bass guitar.

Discography

Studio albums 
 Zvoňte, zvonky (1969)

See also
 The 100 Greatest Slovak Albums of All Time

External links 
 Pavolhammel.sk
 [ Allmusic.com]
 Marianvarga.sk

Slovak rock music groups